Park Ah-sung is a South Korean actor. He is best known for his supporting roles in dramas. He also appeared in series such as Who Are You: School 2015, 4 Legendary Witches and Reply 1988.

Television

Film roles

References

External links 
 

Living people
21st-century South Korean male actors
South Korean male models
South Korean male television actors
South Korean male film actors
1994 births